George C. Chesbro (June 4, 1940 – November 18, 2008) was an American author of detective fiction. His most notable works feature '"Dr. Robert "Mongo the Magnificent" Fredrickson"'. He also wrote the novelisation of the movie The Golden Child starring Eddie Murphy.

Chesbro was born in Washington, D.C. He worked as a special education teacher at Pearl River and later at Rockland Psychiatric Center, where he worked with troubled teens. Chesbro was married and had a son, a daughter and two stepdaughters.

Bibliography

The Mongo Series
 Shadow of a Broken Man 1977
 City of Whispering Stone  1978
 An Affair of Sorcerers 1979
 The Beasts of Valhalla 1985
 Two Songs This Archangel Sings 1987
 The Cold Smell of Sacred Stone 1988
 Second Horseman Out of Eden 1989
 The Language of Cannibals 1990
 In the House of Secret Enemies 1990
 The Fear in Yesterday's Rings 1991
 Dark Chant in a Crimson Key 1992
 An Incident at Bloodtide 1993
 Bleeding in the Eye of a Brainstorm 1995
 Dream of a Falling Eagle 1996
 Lord of Ice and Loneliness 2003 French translation, not published in the US.

The Chant series
 Chant 1986
 Chant: Silent Killer 1987
 Chant: Code of Blood 1987

The Veil Series
 Veil 1986
 Jungle of Steel and Stone 1988

Other Novels
 Bone - Mysterious Press, 1989
 The Golden Child - Pocket, 1986
 Turn Loose The Dragons - Ballantine, 1982
 Crying Freeman - Rivages, 1999 (French translation, novelisation of French film)
 King's Gambit - New English Library, 1976
 The Keeper - Apache Books Publications, 2001
 Prism: A Memoir As Fiction - Apache Books Publications, 2001

Short-Story Collections
 Strange Prey - Apache Beach Publications, 2004
 Lone Wolves - Apache Beach Publications, 2003

References

External links

Dangerous Dwarf, George Chesbro's official site
Inkwell Newswatch Chesbro Interview

1940 births
2008 deaths
American mystery writers
Writers from Washington, D.C.
American male novelists
20th-century American novelists
20th-century American male writers